"Satin Pillows" is a song written by Sonny James & Robert Tubert, which was released by Bobby Vinton in 1965. The song spent 10 weeks on the Billboard Hot 100 chart, peaking at No. 23, while reaching No. 3 on Canada's "RPM Play Sheet".

Chart performance

References

1965 songs
1965 singles
Bobby Vinton songs
Epic Records singles
Songs written by Sonny James